Cystisoma  is a genus of amphipod. It is the only member of the family Cystisomatidae within the Hyperiidea. The genus is noted for its nearly completely transparent body, adapted for life in low light waters.

Description

Gallery 
Cystisoma are characterized by unpigmented, transparent bodies which render them essentially invisible in water unless under precisely angled lighting. Only their eyes are pigmented. There is only a single pair of eyes which are large and directed upwards, being spread into a thin sheet on the upper surface of the head. This is likely an adaption of life in the ocean depths, where the only major light source is from above. 

Marine biologists at Duke University and the Smithsonian analyzed the crustacean's shell and discovered that it was covered in microscopic spheres that significantly reduce reflected light, thus giving the organism an antireflective coating. The spheres are believed to be bacteria due to their morphology and method of reproduction. Minute structures called nanoprotuberances were also observed on the Cystisoma's body, notably on the organism's legs. Researchers believe that they act as a buffer between light and the amphipod's body, significantly reducing surface reflection.

Size 
Cystisoma are the largest of hyperiids, reaching lengths over 100 mm.

Distribution 
Cystisoma inhabit the dim epipelagic and mesopelagic zones. They can be found in all of the world's oceans. They appear to be freely swimming organisms and unlike other hyperiids, do not appear to be closely associated with salps.

Species 
 Cystisoma fabricii Stebbing, 1888
 Cystisoma gershwinae Zeidler, 2003
 Cystisoma latipes (Stephensen, 1918)
 Cystisoma longipes (Bovallius, 1886)
 Cystisoma magna (Woltereck, 1903)
 Cystisoma pellucida (Willemöes-Suhm, 1873)

References

External links 
 Cystisoma Eye

Amphipoda
Crustaceans by year of formal description
Crustaceans described in 1842